Polypeptide N-acetylgalactosaminyltransferase-like protein 2 is an enzyme that in humans is encoded by the GALNTL2 gene.

References

Further reading